Jonatan Lillebror Johansson (born 16 August 1975) is a Finnish football coach and former player. He is the manager of TPS.

His main position was forward, playing most notably for Rangers and Charlton Athletic. Johansson was also a regular in the Finland national team, earning a total of 106 caps.

Club career

Early career
Johansson was born in Stockholm, Sweden, and started his career in Finland with his hometown club Pargas IF. In 1995, he moved on to the Veikkausliiga club TPS Turku. In 1997, he transferred to FC Flora Tallinn, becoming the first Finnish player to move to an Estonian club.

In 1997 he moved to Scotland to join Rangers for a transfer fee of £300,000.

Johansson signed for newly promoted English Premier League club Charlton Athletic in the summer of 2000, for £3.5 million. He competed for a place up front with Shaun Bartlett, Kevin Lisbie and Jason Euell.

On 31 January 2006, having fallen out of contention at The Valley, Johansson was loaned to Football League Championship side Norwich City as a replacement for Dean Ashton. He scored his first goal on 5 February to open an East Anglian derby at home to Ipswich Town, a 2–1 loss.

Johansson and fellow out-of-favour forwards Bartlett and Francis Jeffers were released by Charlton in May 2006. In July he signed with Swedish club Malmö FF until 2008.

Hibernian
On 13 November 2008, Johansson signed a pre-contract agreement with Scottish Premier League side Hibernian. He agreed an 18-month contract with Hibs, after his contract with Malmö FF expired. Johansson was unable to sign until 1 January due to the transfer window rules, but began training in December. He made his debut on 3 January 2009 against Hearts in the Edinburgh derby. Johansson scored his first goal  seven months after signing at East End Park against Dunfermline Athletic in a 4–0 friendly win, but he was expected to leave Hibernian due to the increased competition for places. His departure was confirmed on 1 September 2009.

St Johnstone
It only became apparent that Johansson had signed for St Johnstone on 27 October 2009 when he was named in the starting line-up for their Scottish League Cup quarter-final tie at home to Dundee United. He had previously been training with the club to maintain his fitness ahead of Finland's international matches earlier in the month. Johansson signed a short-term contract until the new year. He scored a winning goal against Hearts on 21 November, which was his first competitive goal in Scotland for ten years, St Johnstone did not renew his short-term contract and Johansson left the club.

Greenock Morton and an unnamed German club made Johansson contract offers, but Johansson rejected Morton's offer.

Return to TPS
On 8 February 2010, Johansson returned  to TPS Turku after spending 14 years abroad. He scored his first goal (a penalty kick) in a Veikkausliga game against VPS Vaasa on 7 May. He also scored twice in the next match, against Inter Turku, in the city's local derby. He also won the 2010 Finnish Cup, 2–0 against HJK Helsinki in the final. He finished the season with 10 goals, being the club's second best goalscorer, only two goals behind Roope Riski. Johansson announced his retirement from professional football on 23 March 2011.

International career
Johansson made his debut for the Finland national team on 16 March 1996 against Kuwait, scoring the game's only goal. He was a regular member of the Finland squad and earned his 100th cap in October 2009. Johansson made a total of 106 appearances for Finland and scored 22 goals. Only Jari Litmanen has made more appearances for Finland than Johansson. As of October 2021, Johansson is fourth in goals scored for Finland, after Teemu Pukki, Litmanen and Mikael Forssell.

After scoring the opening goal in a 2010 FIFA World Cup Qualifying match against Wales, Johansson was the subject of verbal criticism by Craig Bellamy.

Coaching career
Johansson worked for Greenock Morton as their reserve team coach in 2012. He moved to Motherwell in August 2012 to coach their under-20 team. Johansson left Motherwell in July 2015 and was replaced by Stephen Craigan. In December 2016, he was appointed as an assistant coach to Markku Kanerva for the Finland national team.

On 9 April 2017, he was announced as an assistant coach to Rangers manager Pedro Caixinha. After starting work with Rangers, Johansson left his position with the Finland national team.

Morton manager
Johansson was appointed on a two-year contract as manager of Scottish Championship club Greenock Morton on 6 September 2018. His first match in charge ended in a 1–1 draw at Tannadice Park against Dundee United. Johansson left Morton at the end of the 2018–19 season, as the club decided not to exercise the option of retaining him for the second year of his contract.

TPS Turku manager
Johansson was appointed as new manager at TPS on 24 July 2020. He signed an initial two-year contract with the option of another year.

Personal life
Johansson married Jean Anderson, a Scottish television presenter  who is from Port Glasgow, in June 2008.

Career statistics

Club

International
Scores and results list Finland's goal tally first, score column indicates score after each Johansson goal.

See also
 List of men's footballers with 100 or more international caps

References

External links

 

1975 births
Allsvenskan players
Association football forwards
Charlton Athletic F.C. players
Expatriate footballers in England
Expatriate footballers in Estonia
Expatriate footballers in Scotland
FC Flora players
FIFA Century Club
Finland international footballers
Finnish expatriate footballers
Finnish expatriate sportspeople in England
Finnish expatriate sportspeople in Scotland
Finnish football managers
Finnish footballers
Finnish people of Swedish descent
Greenock Morton F.C. managers
Greenock Morton F.C. non-playing staff 
Hibernian F.C. players
Living people
Malmö FF players
Meistriliiga players
Motherwell F.C. non-playing staff
Norwich City F.C. players
Premier League players
Rangers F.C. non-playing staff
Rangers F.C. players
Scottish Football League players
Scottish Premier League players
Scottish Professional Football League managers
Footballers from Stockholm
St Johnstone F.C. players
Swedish-speaking Finns
Turun Palloseura footballers
Veikkausliiga players
TPS Turku football managers
Pargas Idrottsförening players
Finnish expatriate sportspeople in Estonia